Ervin Memetov born 7 February 1990), is a Ukrainian footballer, currently playing for PFC Sevastopol-2.

External links 
 Stats on Sevstopol club

1990 births
Living people
People from Qashqadaryo Region
Ukrainian footballers
FC Sevastopol players

Association football midfielders